Isahak Isahakyan (10 August 1933 – 16 February 2017) was the Vice Chairman of the Yerevan Office of the State Bank of the Armenian SSR from 1978 to 1986. After Armenia gained its independence from the Soviet Union, he became the first Chairman of the Central Bank of Armenia until 1994. Subsequently, he was an advisor to the Chairman of the Central Bank of Armenia.

References

1933 births
2017 deaths
20th-century economists
People from Kurgan, Kurgan Oblast
Chairmen of the Central Bank of Armenia

Recipients of the Order of the Red Banner of Labour
Armenian bankers
Armenian economists
Soviet bankers
Soviet economists